Couargues is a commune in the Cher department in the Centre-Val de Loire region of France.

Geography

Population

Sights

 The presbytery of St. Aignan, dating from the fifteenth century.
 Two watermills.

See also
Communes of the Cher department

References

External links

Website about Couargues 

Communes of Cher (department)